Edgy In Brixton is a DVD by The Fratellis consisting largely of a live concert recorded at the Brixton Academy. It was released 1 October 2007. The DVD is available in standard and deluxe formats.

Track listing

Bonus features

Personnel
 Barry Fratelli – bass
 Mince Fratelli – drums, vocals
 Jon Fratelli – guitar, vocals

External links
 https://www.amazon.co.uk/Fratellis-Edgy-Brixton/dp/B000V7FZ48
 http://www.hmv.co.uk/hmvweb/displayProductDetails.do?ctx=12;1;58;-1&sku=708418

The Fratellis albums
Albums recorded at the Brixton Academy
2007 live albums